Sir Rupert William John Clarke, 3rd Baronet, AM, MBE (5 November 1919 – 4 February 2005) was an Australian soldier, businessman and pastoralist. He achieved success in a number of fields, including horseracing, the military and as a corporate chairman.

Early life and baronetcy
Clarke was born in Sydney, New South Wales, the son of Rupert Clarke, 2nd Baronet (a prominent pastoralist and Member of Parliament) and Elsie Tucker (born in Melbourne). His father purchased the Villa Les Abeilles in Monte Carlo and the young Rupert attended a French-speaking primary school. Upon his father's death on Christmas Day 1926, he succeeded as the 3rd Baronet of Rupertswood when he was only seven years old.

His mother remarried (to the Fifth Marquess of Headfort) and he moved to England. Rupert became an accomplished athlete at Eton and then later at Magdalen College, Oxford. He excelled at shooting, swimming, fencing and rowing, sometimes simultaneously. Scholastically he excelled, particularly in languages. He spent a considerable amount of time travelling through Germany with friends who would soon be on the opposing side during World War II.

Military career
By 1941 he had enlisted in the British Army and was commissioned in the Irish Guards, as aide-de-camp to Lieutenant-General Sir Harold Alexander. Clarke was present at various major turning points in the war, including the withdrawal from Burma, the North African Campaign against the German Afrika Korps and the Invasion of Sicily. As ADC to Alexander, he met Chiang Kai-shek and Pope Pius XII.

He was created a Member of the Order of the British Empire Military division.

In 2000, Sir Rupert wrote a book on his war adventures entitled With Alex at War – From the Irrawaddy to the Po 1941-1945.

Business interests
Clarke returned to Australia and married Kathleen Grant Hay, daughter of successful Melbourne brewery owner, Peter Grant Hay. Following his appointment as a Director (his first of many) of the Richmond Brewery in 1950, Sir Rupert returned to England seeking introductions to inspect breweries.

In early 1951 Sir Rupert and Lady Clarke visited King Ranch in Texas. Sir Rupert, asked the late Robert J. Kleberg, who had founded the Santa Gertrudis breed of cattle in the US, if he would consider a partnership venture to ship cattle to Australia for stud purposes. This approach eventually led to the formation of King Ranch Australia with Peter Baillieu, Sam Hordern and Sir Rupert being the Australian partners recommended to Bob Kleberg by the famous WS Robinson.

Prior to the importation of King Ranch cattle Sir Rupert having sold his property "Kismet" at Sunbury, he purchased Marlborough Station in central Queensland and subsequently Carse O' Gowrie Station near Ravenswood, Queensland.

Forty-five King Ranch Santa Gertrudis bulls arrived in Brisbane on 15 June 1952 but the remaining 27 bulls and 201 heifers were held up for more than nine weeks by a seaman's strike. They arrived in Melbourne around 27 August and after a month of quarantine at Coode Island, came to the family property "Bolinda Vale" to spend a further six weeks before being railed to Queensland. Five bulls, personally selected by Kleberg, were kept by Sir Rupert to establish his own stud herd.

By 1974 the emphasis on pastoral development waned and towards the end of the 1980s the balance of the King Ranch properties in Australia was sold to Bankers Trust for around $100 million.

Clarke became involved in horse racing, and was on the Victoria Amateur Turf Club (now the Melbourne Racing Club) for 40 years, nearly half that time as chairman.

He was also chairman of Cadbury Schweppes Australia, and P&O Australia, deputy chairman of the Distillers Group and the third generation of Clarke baronets to sit on the board of the National Australia Bank. He was also the Honorary Consul of Monaco.

Sir Rupert was engaged in a variety of charitable works, and was made a Member of the Order of Australia in recognition of this.

After Clarke's first wife died in 1999, he married Gillian de Zoete in 2000.

He died in 2005 at the age of 85, leaving three children and his second wife, Gillian de Zoete. His eldest son Rupert succeeded to the baronetcy as Fourth Baronet of Rupertswood. The baronetcy (originally awarded to Sir William Clarke by Queen Victoria in 1882), is only one of two now extant of Australian territorial designation, and the only such baronetcy held by an Australian-born citizen.

References

1919 births
2005 deaths
People educated at Eton College
Alumni of Magdalen College, Oxford
Members of the Order of Australia
Australian Members of the Order of the British Empire
British Army personnel of World War II
Irish Guards officers
Baronets in the Baronetage of the United Kingdom
20th-century Australian businesspeople
Clarke baronets
Australian expatriates in Monaco